Milekhino is a rural locality (a selo) in Vodorazdelnensky Selsoviet of Seryshevsky District, Amur Oblast, Russia. The population was 55 as of 2018.

Geography 
It is located 57 km from Seryshevo, 8 km from Vodorazdelnoye.

References 

Rural localities in Seryshevsky District